In 1959, the British Lions rugby union team toured Australia and New Zealand. The Lions won the two test matches against  but lost the international series against the All Blacks by three matches to one. They also played two matches in Canada, on the return leg of the journey.

Although New Zealand won the series, the results in three of the tests were close. The Lions scored four tries to nil in the first test but six penalties by Don Clarke saw the All Blacks win 18–17. Clarke also scored a late try and conversion to win the second test, 11–8. New Zealand won the third test comfortably by 22–8 to win the series but the fourth test, which the Lions won 9–6, could have gone the All Blacks way had Clarke not missed a late penalty attempt.

Overall the tourists played thirty-three matches, winning twenty-seven and losing six. In Australia the Lions played six matches, winning five and losing one, to New South Wales. In New Zealand they played twenty-five matches, winning twenty and losing five – in addition to their three test defeats they also lost to Otago and Canterbury. They also played two matches in Canada, winning both.

The tour was notable for the 842 points scored in 33 games, a record number of points for a Lions tour and for the 22 tries scored by Tony O'Reilly, also a Lions tour record.

The touring party was captained by Ronnie Dawson. The manager was A. W. Wilson and the assistant manager was O.B. Glasgow.

Touring party

Management 
 Manager A. W. Wilson
 Assistant Manager O. B. Glasgow

Backs 
N. H. Brophy (UCD and )
J. Butterfield (Northampton and )
S. Coughtrie (Edinburgh Academicals and )
Terry Davies (Llanelli and )
M. A. F. English (Bohemians and )
David Hewitt (Queen's University RFC and )
J. P. Horrocks-Taylor (Leicester and )
Peter Jackson (Coventry and )
Dickie Jeeps (Northampton and )
Tony O'Reilly (Old Belvedere and )
Andy Mulligan (Wanderers and )
William "Bill" Michael Patterson (Sale)
Malcolm Price (Pontypool and )
Bev Risman (Manchester and )
Ken Scotland (Cambridge University and )
Malcolm Thomas (Newport and )
G. H. Waddell (Cambridge University and )
J. R. C. Young (Harlequins and )

Forwards 
Alan Ashcroft (Waterloo and )
Ronnie Dawson (Wanderers and )
Roddy Evans (Cardiff and )
John Faull (Swansea and )
Hugh McLeod (Hawick and )
David Marques (Harlequins and )
Bryn Meredith (Newport and )
Syd Millar (Ballymena and )
Haydn Morgan (Abertillery and )
Bill Mulcahy (UCD and )
Noel Murphy (Cork Constitution and )
Ray Prosser (Pontypool and )
Ken Smith (Kelso and )
Rhys Williams (Llanelli and )
Gordon Wood (Garryowen and )

Results 
 Test matches

The matches

First Australia Test

Australia: JK Lenehan (NSW), AR Morton (NSW), JM Potts (NSW), LJ Diett (NSW), KJ Donald (Queensland), AJ Summons (NSW), DM Connor (Queensland), PK Dunn (NSW), PG Johnson (NSW), KJ Ellis (NSW); JH Carroll (NSW), AK Millar (NSW); PT Fenwicke (NSW) Captain, K Outterside (NSW), John Thornett (NSW)

British Lions: KJF Scotland, PB Jackson, M Price, D Hewitt, AJF O'Reilley, AB Risman, REG Jeeps, HF McLeod, AR Dawson Captain, S Millar, GK Smith, WA Mulcahy, RH Williams, A Ashcroft, J Faull

Second Australia Test

Australia: JK Lenehan (NSW), AR Morton (NSW), AR Kay (Victoria), LJ Diett (NSW), KJ Donald (Queensland), AJ Summons (NSW), DM Connor (Queensland); KJ Ellis (NSW), PG Johnson (NSW), PK Dunn (NSW); JH Carroll (NSW), AK Millar (NSW), JE Thornett (NSW), K Outterside (NSW), PT Fenwicke (NSW) Captain

British Lions: KJF Scotland, PB Jackson, D Hewitt, M Price, AJF O'Reilley, AB Risman, REG Jeeps, HF McLeod, AR Dawson Captain, S Millar, WR Evans, RH Williams, NAA Murphy, RWD Marques, GK Smith

First New Zealand Test

New Zealand: DB Clarke (Waikato), PT Walsh (Counties), RF McMullen (Auckland), TR Lineen (Auckland), BE McPhail (Canterbury), RH Brown (Taranaki), RJ Urbahn (Taranaki); WJ Whineray (Canterbury) Captain, RC Hemi (Waikato), IJ Clarke (Waikato), SF Hill (Canterbury), BE Finlay (Manauatu), PFH Jones (North Auckland), EAR Pickering (Waikato), IN MacEwan (Wellington)

British Lions: KJF Scotland, PB Jackson, MJ Price, D Hewitt, AJF O'Reilley, ABW Risman, REG Jeeps, HF McLeod, AR Dawson Captain, BGM Wood, WR Evans, RH Williams, GK Smith, J Faull, NA Murphy

Second New Zealand Test

New Zealand: DB Clarke (Waikato), ES Diack (Otago), RF McMullen (Auckland), TR Lineen (Auckland), RW Caulton (Wellington), JF McCullough (Taranaki), KC Briscoe (Taranaki), WJ Whineray (Canterbury) Captain, DS Webb (North Auckland), IJ Clarke (Waikato), SF Hill (Canterbury), IN MacEwan (Wellington), CE Meads (Kings Country), RJ Conway (Otago), KR Tremain (Canterbury)

British Lions: TE Davies, JRC Young, MC Thomas, WM Patterson, AJF O'Reilley, MJ Price, REG Jeeps, S Millar, AR Dawson Captain, HF McLeod, RH Williams, WR Evans, A Ashcroft, RWD Marques, NA Murphy

Third New Zealand Test

New Zealand: DB Clarke (Waikato), RH Brown (Taranaki), TR Lineen (Auckland), RW Caulton (Wellington), JF McCullough (Taranaki), RJ Urbahn (Taranaki), MW Irwin (Otago), RC Hemi (Waikato), WJ Whineray (Canterbury) Captain, SF Hill (Canterbury), IN MacEwan (Wellington), KR Tremain (Canterbury), RJ Conway (Otago), CE Meads (Kings Country)

British Lions: KJF Scotland, PB Jackson, MJ Price, D Hewitt, AJF O'Reilley, JP Horrocks-Taylor, REG Jeeps, HF McLeod, AR Dawson Captain, BGM Wood, WR Evans, RH Williams, HJ Morgan, J Faull, GK Smith

Fourth New Zealand Test

New Zealand: DB Clarke (Waikato), BE McPhail (Canterbury), TR Lineen (Auckland), AH Clarke (Auckland), RW Caulton (Wellington), JF McCullough (Taranaki), RJ Urbahn (Taranaki), MW Irwin (Otago), RC Hemi (Waikato), WJ Whineray (Canterbury) Captain, SF Hill (Canterbury), CE Meads (Kings Country), EAR Pickering (Waikato), RJ Conway (Otago), KR Tremain (Canterbury)

British Lions: TE Davies, PB Jackson, D Hewitt, KJF Scotland, AJF O'Reilley, ABW Risman, AA Mulligan, TR Prosser, AR Dawson Captain, HF McLeod, RH Williams, WA Mulcahy, NA Murphy, J Faull, HJ Morgan

References 

1959 rugby union tours
1959 in New Zealand rugby union
1959
1959
Rugby union tours of Canada
1959 in Australian rugby union
1958–59 in British rugby union
1958–59 in Irish rugby union
1959 in Canadian rugby union